Bauni is a language spoken in Barupu (Warapu) village of West Aitape Rural LLG, Sandaun Province, Papua New Guinea.

The alternative name Barupu or Warapu, from the name of the Bauni village, has been applied to related languages as well, and 'Warapu' may be retained as a cover term.

Phonology
Phonemes in Barupu:

{| 
| p || t ||  || k
|-
| b || r ||  || 
|-
| m || n ||  || 
|-
| w ||  || j || 
|}

{| 
| i || u
|-
| e || o
|-
|  || ɔ
|-
| a || 
|}

References

External links

Languages of Sandaun Province
Piore River languages